"Our Song" is a song by English singer and songwriter Anne-Marie and Irish singer-songwriter Niall Horan. It was released on 21 May 2021 as the third single from the former's second studio album, Therapy (2021). Produced by TMS, "Our Song" was written by the two singers along with Philip Plested and the three members of TMS. The ballad's lyrics has the vocalists reminiscing about a past relationship.

In October 2020, Anne-Marie posted on Instagram that she was in a recording studio with Horan; the pair ended up writing three songs together. The song was announced on 13 May 2021, with the singers posting a 10-second clip on Twitter.

Our Song was a commercial success it peaked at number 13 on the UK singles chart becoming Anne-Marie's ninth top 20 entry and Horan's third. Elsewhere it became a top ten hit on the Irish singles chart were it peaked at number 7.

Music video
The music video for "Our Song" was directed by Michael Holyk and features the two singers as Bonnie and Clyde-type lovers as they escape from the police in a Jaguar XK120.

Live performances
The pair performed "Our Song" for BBC Radio 1's Big Weekend, on The Jonathan Ross Show, and on The Tonight Show Starring Jimmy Fallon.

Chart performance
On the UK Singles Chart, "Our Song" peaked at number 13, giving Anne-Marie her ninth and Horan his third top 20 hit. On the Irish Singles Chart, the song debuted at number 10 and latter peaked at number 7, giving Anne-Marie her fourth and Horan his sixth top-10 entry.

Track listings
Digital release
"Our Song" – 2:43

Digital release – Luca Schreiner remix
"Our Song" (Luca Schreiner remix) – 2:44

Digital release – acoustic version
"Our Song" (acoustic) – 2:55

Digital release – Moka Nola remix
"Our Song" (Moka Nola remix) – 3:32

Digital release – Just Kiddin remix
"Our Song" (Just Kiddin remix) – 3:32

Charts

Certifications

Release history

References 

2020s ballads
2021 singles
Anne-Marie (singer) songs
Asylum Records singles
Male–female vocal duets
Niall Horan songs
Pop ballads
Song recordings produced by TMS (production team)
Songs written by Anne-Marie (singer)
Songs written by Ben Kohn
Songs written by Niall Horan
Songs written by Peter Kelleher (songwriter)
Songs written by Tom Barnes (songwriter)
Warner Music Group singles